High Knob is a peak of the Blue Ridge Mountains in Warren and Fauquier counties, Virginia.

Geography
The  peak is located in between Manassas Gap to the north and Chester Gap to the south, just east of Front Royal.  The summit of the peak is located in Warren County and is the highest point of the Blue Ridge north of Shenandoah National Park which is just south of the peak across Chester Gap.  The Appalachian Trail crosses the eastern slope of the peak.  A housing development occupies the summit and the western slope. The mountain was also a strategic location used during the Battle of Wapping Heights during the American Civil War. It is a gated community with two entrances to the top, one is from the road near the Apple House. The main entrance is further up the road where there is a gate and a bus stop.

References

External links
 

Mountains of Fauquier County, Virginia
Mountains of Warren County, Virginia
Mountains of Virginia
Blue Ridge Mountains